Sun Shao may refer to:

 Sun Shao (Changxu) (孫邵; 163-225), courtesy name Changxu (長緒), first chancellor of Eastern Wu
 Sun Shao (孫紹), posthumous son of the Han dynasty warlord Sun Ce
 Sun Shao (general) (孫韶), Eastern Wu general of the Three Kingdoms period